In Portugal, ENES is an acronym for 'Exames Nacionais do Ensino Secundário' (Secondary Education National Exams). Specifically, the ENES Sheet is a document containing the students final secondary education classification (GPA) as well as the exam results of the "provas específicas" (specific exams) used to apply to university or polytechnical institutions.

See also
Higher education in Portugal
Education in Portugal

Education in Portugal